"Bride of Chaotica!" is the 106th episode of the American science fiction television series Star Trek: Voyager airing on the UPN network, the 12th episode of the fifth season. The episode originally aired on January 27, 1999.  The episode largely takes place on the holodeck, which is running a holo-program in black and white instead of the usual color. This was because of a small fire to the Bridge set that had occurred while the episode was in production; as a result the Bridge scenes were shot weeks later after the set was repaired and scenes that were originally set for the Bridge were either entirely rewritten or set on a different part of the ship. The episode satirizes numerous elements of the classic 1936 film serial Flash Gordon and classic 1939 film serial Buck Rogers.

In this episode, Voyager becomes stuck in a interdimensional rift as photonic beings from another dimension attempt first contact in the holodeck, meeting the photonic villains of Ensign Paris' "Captain Proton" program, who promptly attack them.

Plot
During an episode of The Adventures of Captain Proton on the holodeck in a recurring Voyager hologram program in the style of vintage movie serials such as Flash Gordon and Buck Rogers, Ensigns Tom Paris and Harry Kim are forced to leave the program running when spatial distortions trap the ship and disrupt their control over the computer. While the command staff of Voyager seek to discover a way to free the ship from the spatial distortions, extra-dimensional aliens who exist in a photonic state cross over from their own dimension through a distortion located in the holodeck. There, they are detected and attacked by Dr. Chaotica, who believes them to be from the fifth dimension, and whose holographic (photonic) weaponry — though harmless to humans — is deadly to the aliens.

Eventually, the crew discover the war being waged between Chaotica and the fifth dimension and must defeat him by playing out their roles as the fictional Captain Proton (Tom Paris), his sidekick Buster Kincaid (Harry Kim), the President of Earth (the Doctor, who is himself a photonic being), and Arachnia, Queen of the Spider People - a campy space queen who is destined to be Chaotica's bride. Paris asks Captain Janeway to take on the role of femme fatale Queen Arachnia. Mortified, she refuses such an indignity, but reluctantly agrees in order to help Voyager out of its predicament.

Inside the program and now in full costume, Janeway/Queen Arachnia uses her charms to try to manipulate Chaotica into lowering the "lightning shield" protecting his fortress under the pretence that her loyal subjects in their "spider ships" can attend their wedding. Chaotica becomes suspicious of Arachnia so she attempts to deactivate the shield herself but Chaotica traps her in his "confinement rings" force field for double crossing him, telling her he will kill her after their wedding night. Using a vial of her "spider pheromones" to hypnotize Chaotica's guard, Arachnia manipulates him into freeing her. She then deactivates the lightning shield enabling Captain Proton to fire his "destructo beam" at Chaotica and defeat him, thereby freeing Voyager and allowing ship and crew to continue on their journey home.

Reception
In 2012, Den of Geek ranked "Bride of Chaotica!" as the fifth best episode of Star Trek: Voyager.

In 2014, io9 ranked "Bride of Chaotica!" as the 100th out of 100 of the best of over 700 episodes across the entire Star Trek television franchise. In 2019, Comic Book Resources rated "Bride of Chaotica!" as the second most funny episode of all Star Trek.

Dany Roth writing for SyFy Wire in 2017, ranked this the 3rd best episode that Bryan Fuller wrote for; they felt "It's campy, hilarious, hysterical, brilliant, and an absolute joy" and said it might be the best holodeck episode.

In 2019, CBR ranked "Bride of Chaotica!" as the best holodeck episode of all Star Trek episodes. In 2021, they highlighted this episode as an example of the series "having fun with its goofier side"

In 2021, Tor.com rated this 10 out 10, remarking "This is simply an enjoyable episode of Star Trek" despite some misgiving about it making sense, and commending Mulgrew for a  "stupendous performance."

Releases 
On April 25, 2001, this episode was released on LaserDisc in Japan, as part of the half-season collection, 5th Season vol.1 . This included episodes from "Night" to "Bliss" on seven double sided 12 inch optical discs, with English and Japanese audio tracks for the episodes.

On November 9, 2004, this episode was released as part of the season 5 DVD box set of Star Trek: Voyager. The box set includes seven DVD optical discs with all the episodes in season 5 with some extra features, and episodes have a Dolby Digital 5.1 surround sound audio track.

References

External links

 

Holography in television
Star Trek: Voyager (season 5) episodes
1999 American television episodes
Television episodes written by Bryan Fuller